Quest for the Lost Tribes is a Canadian documentary film, directed by Simcha Jacobovici and released in 1998. The film documents their travels to various places in Africa and Asia, to investigate various claims that local populations are the purported Ten Lost Tribes of Israel.

The film premiered at the John Bassett Theatre in Toronto on November 22, 1998. It received various theatrical screenings through 1999, before being broadcast by CBC Television in Canada and A&E in the United States in 2000.

The film received a Genie Award nomination for Best Feature Length Documentary at the 20th Genie Awards in 2000.

References

External links
 

1998 films
1998 documentary films
Canadian documentary films
Films directed by Simcha Jacobovici
Jewish Canadian films
1990s English-language films
1990s Canadian films